Albert Hammond (born 1944) is a Gibraltarian singer, songwriter, and record producer.

Albert Hammond may also refer to:

 Albert Hammond (album)
 Albert Hammond Jr. (born 1980), American guitarist, singer, songwriter and music producer, son of the Gibraltarian musician
 Albert Hammond (footballer) (1924–1989), English football inside forward
 Albert Hammond (Wisconsin politician) (1883–1968), American businessman and politician

Hammond, Albert